Herman F. Pritchard (October 10, 1883 – after April 1942) was an American football player and coach.  He attended Swarthmore College near Philadelphia, graduating in 1908 with a Master of Arts degree in mathematics.  He was the captain of the 1907 Swarthmore football team that compiled a 6–2 record, and the recipient of the Ivy Medal at Swarthmore in 1908.  He was the head coach of the Rutgers Scarlet Knights football team in 1909.  In one year as a head coach, he compiled a record of 3–5–1.  He became a math teacher at Norristown High School, and later served as a teacher and football coach at Barringer High School in Newark, New Jersey.  In April 1942, he was living in Millburn, New Jersey and was employed by the Newark Board of Education.

Head coaching record

References

1883 births
Year of death missing
Rutgers Scarlet Knights football coaches
Swarthmore Garnet Tide football players
High school football coaches in New Jersey
People from Hancock County, Indiana
Players of American football from Newark, New Jersey
Players of American football from Indiana